Mohammed Auff Haneefa (born 11 November 1959), popularly known as Shashi Wijendra (ශෂී විජේන්ද්‍ර), is a former actor in Sri Lankan cinema. He was one of the most popular film actor in 1980s and 1990s. He quit from acting in 1996. Currently he is a businessman.

Early life and education
Shashi Wijendra was born on 11 November 1959 in Kandy and is a Muslim by birth. He completed primary  education from Badulla Dharmadutha College and secondary education from Zahira College Gampola.

Acting career
He first entered stage dramas under Tamil producer. His stage name was "Shashi Quintus". However, he was unable to read and write Tamil. Therefore, he used to translate the dialogues into Sinhala and started to act. After few months, he quit from acting and started to write stage plays. He produced the play Sahajatha and continued for more than 50 shows.

In 1983 he left the country and went to Dubai. After two years he returned to Sri Lanka. Haneefa joined the cinema in 1985 with the film Obata Diwura Kiyannam directed by Sunil Soma Pieris and produced the film along with Anoja Weerasinghe. It was a Super Hit and became the highest grossing Sri Lankan film in 1985. Then Shashi became a star in one night. He used the stage name "Shashi Wijendra" in cinema. Since then, he acted in many popular commercial films such as Amme Oba Nisa, Shakthiya Obai Amme, Uthura Dakuna, Cheriyo Captain, Obata Pamanai Adare, Wana Bambara, Okkoma Rajawaru, Raja Daruwo, Sinha Raja, Bambasara Bisaw, Soora Veera Chandiyo and Vijay saha Ajay. Most of his films are commercially successful and passed 100 days in theatres. In 1992, he won the award for the most popular actor at Sarasaviya Awards.

His brother Auff Munawer joined the cinema with Shashi and changed the name to Ranga Wijendra. He later became a film producer and director. The two had even announced their removal from the mosque because of their departure from the Muslim community. Later he converted to Muslim again with his brother after it was reported that due to pressure from the Muslim community. He and his brother quit from cinema at the peak of their career. His last film was Putha Mage Sooraya directed by Ranjith Jayasinghe screened in 2011.

Personal life
He is married to a Sinhala lady in 1996 who later converted to Muslim with the name Shaheena. The couple have four sons and one daughter. In 1996, Haneefa left Sri Lanka and went to Malaysia. He returned to Sri Lanka in 2013 and Participated TV Programme on Sirasa TV. It was his first public appearance after 17 years. He is currently a successful businessman who runs a mahogany project on Dambulla Road, Matale.

Filmography

References

External links
 බෙග් මාස්ටර්ලාගේ සංස්කෘතික විශ්වය සහ ආගමික අන්තවාදය

Sri Lankan male film actors
Living people
1959 births